Henry Gustaves Kaltenbrun (15 May 1897 in Vryburg – 15 February 1971) was a top South African cyclist from the 1920s.

In the 1920 Summer Olympics, Henry Kaltenbrun won the 100-mile Men's Road Race but was only awarded the Silver Medal after an appeal by Swedish competitor Stenquist claimed he had lost 4 minutes at a railway crossing. Kaltenbrun went on to win a Bronze in the 4000m Team Pursuit with C. Walker, W.R. Smith (who together also got Bronze in the tandem) and H.W. Goosen. Kaltenbrun also represented South Africa at the 1924 Summer Olympics.
Henry Kaltenbrun and G.B. Thursfield, were the only two cyclists who toured Australia and New Zealand in 1921 and 1922 as part of a Springbok team of athletes and cyclists. On this tour Kaltenbrun won a total of 21 cycling races and broke 4 records while Thursfield won 13 cycling races and broke 3 records .
In 1921, Kaltenbrun won the South African quarter-mile, half-mile, 1-mile, 5-mile and 10-mile track championships. He repeated the 1-mile and 5-mile one in 1923 and again the a half-mile and 1-mile in 1924. According to W Jowett's records, Kaltenbrun only won one Natal title, the 5-mile in 1921. (Source: W Jowett: Centenary)

References

1897 births
1971 deaths
People from Vryburg
South African male cyclists
Olympic cyclists of South Africa
Cyclists at the 1920 Summer Olympics
Cyclists at the 1924 Summer Olympics
Olympic silver medalists for South Africa
Olympic bronze medalists for South Africa
Olympic medalists in cycling
Medalists at the 1920 Summer Olympics